A Natural Disaster is the seventh album by the British rock band Anathema. It was released on 3 November 2003 in the United Kingdom and on 24 February 2004 in the United States through Music for Nations.

Background
This is the first album to feature the band's original bassist Jamie Cavanagh, brother of band members Vincent and Daniel, who left in 1991, prior to any release, and returned in 2001.

Track listing

Personnel

Band members 
 Vincent Cavanagh – vocals, guitars, vocoder
 John Douglas – drums
 Les Smith – keyboards, programming
 Jamie Cavanagh – bass, programming
 Danny Cavanagh – guitars, keyboards, vocals on "Are You There?" and "Electricity"

Guest musicians 
 Anna Livingstone – additional vocals on "Are You There?"
 Lee Douglas – vocals on "A Natural Disaster"

Production 
 Travis Smith – artwork
 Les Smith – engineering
 Dan Turner – producer, engineering
 Nick Griffiths – engineering assistant

References 

2004 albums
Anathema (band) albums
Music for Nations albums